This is a list of episodes for the first season of the French teen drama science fiction television series, Code Lyoko: Evolution created by Thomas Romain and Tania Palumbo and produced by the MoonScoop Group for France Télévisions, Lagardere Thematiques and M6, in association with Sofica Cofanim and Backup Media. It is a live-action reboot of the French animated television series Code Lyoko. , produced by the French company MoonScoop Group, that first aired in 2013.

List of Episodes
Set one year after the events of the animated series
the Ice Sector and Forest Sector are lost due to the long period of inactivity of the Supercomputer. It has not been confirmed whether Jeremy will restore the Ice Sector and Forest Sector or not; towers are now black and rectangular and partially open when activated 
Monsters explode into red metallic particles instead of emitting a bright white light
William Dunbar is welcomed back as the fifth Lyoko Warrior.  His Lyoko attire is still black, like when he was serving under X.A.N.A.
While Ulrich and William retain all of their powers from the original series with a few differences in appearance, Yumi is never seen using her slightly enhanced telekinesis nor Odd his purple energy "Shield", long-lost "future flash" ability nor his one-time teleportation or Ulrich's triangulation. 
Yumi is given an additional weapon: a Bo staff, though not used as much as her Tessen fans. 
Odd can now summon an additional pair of gloves on top of his paw-like ones that shoot six laser arrows as opposed to just one
Ulrich, Odd and Yumi are now capable of deactivating towers due to the source codes implanted in their bodies by X.A.N.A.
An additional enemy makes himself known: a scientist named Lowell Tyron, who was a member of Project Carthage alongside Waldo Franz Schaeffer, later known as Franz Hopper
Professor Tyron has his own supercomputer generating a virtual world named the Cortex. The last remaining trace of X.A.N.A. is hiding within the Cortex, so the Lyoko Warriors must destroy the Cortex in order to finish X.A.N.A. off for good
Jeremy programs an adaptable vehicle to travel in the Cortex called "the Megapod" with Odd as the driver
In additional to X.A.N.A.'s monsters, the five Lyoko Warriors battle Ninjas, which are Tyron's subordinates wearing special suits that allow them to control virtual avatars in the Cortex
Aelita's long-lost mother, Anthea Hopper, is revealed to be very much alive and has been living in Switzerland as Professor Lowell Tyron's wife for the last four years. Unfortunately, she is completely oblivious that she has been manipulated by her ambitious second husband and of the existence of X.A.N.A. She was led to believe that her only child had died.  
Girl genius Laura Gauthier temporarily joins the group to help Jeremy create a virus great enough to destroy the Cortex and X.A.N.A., but her recklessness ultimately forces them to kick her out of the group and erase her memory.
Jeremy successfully launches the virus on the Cortex. However, Professor Tyron shuts his supercomputer down before it can fully take effect on X.A.N.A., meaning there is a distinct possibility that the rouge multi-agent system still resides within and can be reawakened at any time should Professor Tryon reactivate his supercomputer.

References

Evolution
Code Lyoko Evolution